Brother's Keeper is the eighth studio album by American singer and songwriter Rich Mullins, released in 1995.

Mullins originally considered naming the album "Songs" to draw ironic contrast from the unusually long titles of his previous albums. In a 1995 radio special, Mullins commented, "It's a real in-house kind of record. We didn't hire background singers; we had the wives of the guys sing for backgrounds...It was more of a family kind of project, which for me was a real blast."

The artwork on the album cover was produced by Jimmy Abegg, a member of Mullins' band.

Track listing 

 "Brothers Keeper" (Rich Mullins, Beaker) – 3:16
Appeared on compilation Songs 2 1999
 "Let Mercy Lead" (Rich Mullins, Beaker) – 4:25
Appeared on compilation Songs 1996
 "Hatching of the Heart" (Rich Mullins) – 4:41
 "Promenade" (Rich Mullins) – 2:45
 "Wounds of Love" (Rich Mullins, Beaker) – 4:38
 "Damascus Road" (Rich Mullins, Beaker) – 3:09
 "Eli's Song" (Rich Mullins, Lee Lundgren, Nicole Lundgren) – 3:03
 "Cry The Name" (Rich Mullins, Beaker) – 5:53
 "The Breaks" (Rich Mullins) – 4:05
 "Quoting Deuteronomy to the Devil" (Rich Mullins, Beaker) – 3:50

Charts

Radio singles

Personnel 

 Rich Mullins – lead vocals, acoustic piano (3, 5), synthesizer (3), hammered dulcimer (7), door sounds (8)
 Phil Madeira – Hammond B3 organ (1, 5, 9), electric guitar (1, 2, 5, 6), backing vocals (2), accordion (4), drums (4, 7), hi-strung electric guitar (6), tambourine (6), acoustic guitar (8), keyboard harmonica (8), National guitar (10), rhythm guitar (10), slide guitar (10), hambone (10)
 Beaker – acoustic guitar (1), whistle (8)
 Rick Elias – acoustic guitar (1-4, 7, 8, 9), hi-strung acoustic guitar (1, 2, 9), electric guitar (2, 6, 8, 10)
 Jimmy Abegg – bass guitar, acoustic guitar (2, 3, 9, 10), guitar solo (2, 3), gut-string guitar (3, 7), electric guitar (4, 8), mandolin (8), National guitar (10), rhythm guitar (10), hambone (10)
 Aaron Smith – drums (1, 2, 3, 5, 6, 8, 9, 10), backing vocals (2), percussion (3), shaker (8), thunder sounds (8), rain stick (8), hambone (10)
 Lee Lundgren – shaker (1), kalimba (1), Hammond B3 organ (2, 8), accordion (3, 4, 7, 9), melodica (4), harmonica (5), acoustic guitar (6, 8), pipes (7), Lenophone (10)
 Nicki Lundgren – backing vocals (1, 2, 6, 7), harmony vocals (7)
 Linda Elias – backing vocals (2, 6, 7)
 Julie Strasser – backing vocals (2, 6, 7)

Production

 Jimmy Abegg – producer, design, illustration
 Rick Elias – producer
 Lee Lundgren – producer 
 Phil Madeira – producer
 Rich Mullins – producer, executive producer 
 Aaron Smith – producer
 Don Donahue – A&R 
 JB – engineer, mixing at The Saltmine, Nashville, Tennessee
 Todd Robins – assistant engineer, mix assistant 
 Wade Jaynes – assistant engineer, mix assistant 
 Hank Williams – mastering at MasterMix, Nashville, Tennessee
 The Battery, Nashville, Tennessee – recording location
 Quad Studios, Nashville, Tennessee – recording location
 Rob Birkhead – art direction 
 Diana Lussenden – design 
 Ben Pearson – photography

References 

Rich Mullins albums
1995 albums